The following is a list of court cases in the United States concerning slavery.

See also
 Freedom suit
 Slavery in the colonial United States
 Slavery in the United States
 Slave trade acts
 The Abolition Riot of 1836 took place in a courtroom

References

 
Freedom suits in the United States
Slavery-related lists